"Was ist das" is a song written by Bob Arnz and Gerd Zimmermann, and recorded by German singer LaFee. It was released as the third single from LaFee's album LaFee in September 2006. An English version of the song, entitled "What's Wrong with Me", later appeared on LaFee's third studio album Shut Up.

Track listing
CD Maxi Single
 "Was ist das" (Radio mix) - 3:22
 "Was ist das" (Album mix) - 3:54
 "Was ist das" (Hacienda mix) - 5:47
 "Warum" - 3:35

Charts

References

2006 songs
LaFee songs
Songs written by Bob Arnz
EMI Records singles
Songs written by Gerd Zimmermann (songwriter)